The Mighty Anselmo and His Squire is a 1972  comedy film directed by  Bruno Corbucci and starring Alighiero Noschese and Enrico Montesano.

Plot

Cast 

 Alighiero Noschese as Anselmo da Montebello
 Enrico Montesano as  Gianpuccio Senzaterra
 Erminio Macario as  Frà Prosdocimo Zatterin from San Donà di Piave
 Mario Carotenuto as  Bishop of Montebello 
 Lino Banfi as  Fra Prosdocimo's Servant
 Renzo Montagnani as  Ottone di Buldoffen
 Tamara Baroni as Gerbina 
 Maria Baxa as  Fiammetta
 Femi Benussi as Laura
  Sandro Dori as  The Peasant
  Marie Sophie as  Leonzia
 Ignazio Leone as Bishop at the Execution 
  Mimmo Poli as The Innkeeper
  Marcello Martana as  Marcozzo

References

External links

Italian comedy films
1972 comedy films
1972 films
Films directed by Bruno Corbucci
Films scored by Guido & Maurizio De Angelis
Films set in the Middle Ages
1970s Italian films